The women's 1500 metres at the 2022 World Athletics Indoor Championships took place on 18 and 19 March 2022.

Results

Heats
Qualification: First 3 in each heat (Q) and the next 3 fastest (q) advance to the Final

The heats were started on 18 March at 12:20.

Final
The final was started on 19 March at 20:35

References

1500 metres
1500 metres at the World Athletics Indoor Championships